Nepal Standard Time (NPT) is the time zone for Nepal. With a time offset from Coordinated Universal Time (UTC) of UTC+05:45 all over Nepal, it is one of only three time zones with a 45-minute offset from UTC.

NPT is an approximation of Kathmandu mean time, which is 5:41:16 ahead of UTC.

Nepal used local solar time until 1920, in Kathmandu UTC+05:41:16. In 1920, Nepal adopted Indian Standard Time, UTC+05:30. In 1986 Nepal advanced their clocks by 15 minutes, giving them a time zone of UTC+05:45.

See also 
Date and time notation in Nepal
UTC+05:40
UTC+05:45

References

Notes

External links
Nepali Time & calendar for both PC & Web
Nepali calendar
Nepali Time
Nepali Time
Nepali Time and Date with Calendar
Current time in Nepal
Nepali Date Today

Time zones
Time in Nepal